Estouches is a former commune in the Essonne department in Île-de-France in northern France. On 1 January 2019, it was merged into the new commune Le Mérévillois.

Inhabitants of Estouches are known as Estornaciens.

See also 

 Communes of the Essonne department

References 

Former communes of Essonne
Populated places disestablished in 2019